In phenology, season creep refers to observed changes in the timing of the seasons, such as earlier indications of spring widely observed in temperate areas across the Northern Hemisphere.
Phenological records analyzed by climate scientists have shown significant temporal trends in the observed time of seasonal events,
from the end of the 20th century and continuing into the 21st century. In Europe, season creep has been associated with the arrival of spring moving up by approximately one week in a recent 30-year period.
Other studies have put the rate of season creep measured by plant phenology in the range of 2–3 days per decade advancement in spring, and 0.3–1.6 days per decade delay in autumn, over the past 30–80 years.

Observable changes in nature related to season creep include birds laying their eggs earlier and buds appearing on some trees in late winter. In addition to advanced budding, flowering trees have been blooming earlier, for example the culturally-important cherry blossoms in Japan,
and Washington, D.C.
Northern hardwood forests  have been trending toward leafing out sooner, and retaining their green canopies longer.
The agricultural growing season has also expanded by 10–20 days over the last few decades.

The effects of season creep have been noted by non-scientists as well, including gardeners who have advanced their spring planting times,
and experimented with plantings of less hardy warmer climate varieties of non-native plants. While summer growing seasons are expanding, winters are getting warmer and shorter, resulting in reduced winter ice cover on bodies of water,
earlier ice-out,
earlier melt water flows,
and earlier spring lake level peaks.
Some spring events, or "phenophases", have become intermittent or unobservable; for example, bodies of water that once froze regularly most winters now freeze less frequently,
and formerly migratory birds are now seen year-round in some areas.

Relationship to global warming

The full impact of global warming is forecast to happen in the future, but climate scientists have cited season creep as an easily observable effect of climate change that has already occurred and continues to occur.
A large systematic phenological examination of data on 542 plant species in 21 European countries from 1971–2000 showed that 78% of all leafing, flowering, and fruiting records advanced while only 3% were significantly delayed, and these observations were consistent with measurements of observed warming.
Similar changes in the phenology of plants and animals are occurring across marine, freshwater, and terrestrial groups studied, and these changes are also consistent with the expected impact of global warming.

While phenology fairly consistently points to an earlier spring across temperate regions of North America, a recent comprehensive study of the subarctic showed greater variability in the timing of green-up, with some areas advancing, and some having no discernible trend over a recent 44-year period.
Another 40 year phenological study in China found greater warming over that period in the more northerly sites studied, with sites experiencing cooling mostly in the south, indicating that the temperature variation with latitude is decreasing there.
This study also confirmed that season creep was correlated with warming, but the effect is non-linear—phenophases advanced less with greater warming, and retarded more with greater cooling.

Shorter winters and longer growing seasons may appear to be a benefit to society from global warming, but the effects of advanced phenophases may also have serious consequences for human populations. Modeling of snowmelt predicted that warming of 3 to 5 °C in the Western United States could cause snowmelt-driven runoff to occur as much as two months earlier, with profound effects on hydroelectricity, land use, agriculture, and water management.
Since 1980, earlier snowmelt and associated warming has also been associated with an increase in length and severity of the wildfire season there.

Season creep may also have adverse effects on plant species as well. Earlier flowering could occur before pollinators such as honey bees become active, which would have negative consequences for pollination and reproduction. Shorter and warmer winters may affect other environmental adaptations including cold hardening of trees, which could result in frost damage during more severe winters.

Etymology

Season creep was included in the 9th edition of the Collins English Dictionary published in London June 4, 2007.
The term was popularized in the media after the report titled "Season Creep: How Global Warming Is Already Affecting The World Around Us" was published by the American environmental organization Clear the Air on March 21, 2006.
In the "Season Creep" report, Jonathan Banks, Policy Director for Clear the Air, introduced the term as follows:

See also
Orbital forcing
Climate change and birds
Phenological mismatch

Other uses

The term "season creep" has been applied in other contexts as well:
 In professional sports, season creep refers to lengthening of the playing season, especially the extension of the MLB season to 162 games.
 In college athletics, season creep refers to longer periods athletes spend training in their sport.
 In American politics, campaign season creep refers to the need for candidates to start fund raising activities sooner.
 In retailing,  holiday season creep, also known as Christmas creep refers to the earlier appearance of Christmas-themed merchandising, extending the holiday shopping season.

References

Effects of climate change
Neologisms
Climatology